Didier Martel (born 26 October 1971) is a French former professional footballer who played as a midfielder. His career was based in France and the Netherlands. During his career, Martel played for Auxerre, Nîmes, Châteauroux, ASOA Valence, Paris Saint-Germain, Utrecht, Vitesse, Helmond Sport and Gallia Club Lunel.

External links

1971 births
Living people
Sportspeople from Fréjus
French footballers
Association football midfielders
AJ Auxerre players
Nîmes Olympique players
LB Châteauroux players
ASOA Valence players
Paris Saint-Germain F.C. players
FC Utrecht players
SBV Vitesse players
Helmond Sport players
French expatriate footballers
French expatriate sportspeople in the Netherlands
Expatriate footballers in the Netherlands